Admiral Herbert may refer to:

Arthur Herbert, 1st Earl of Torrington (c. 1648–1716), British Royal Navy admiral
Gretchen S. Herbert (born 1962), U.S. Navy rear admiral
Peter Herbert (Royal Navy officer) (1929–2019), British Royal Navy admiral
Thomas Herbert (Royal Navy officer) (1793–1861), British Royal Navy vice admiral
Thomas Herbert, 8th Earl of Pembroke (c. 1656–1733), Lord High Admiral of the United Kingdom